Brachiaria mutica (Urochloa mutica) is a species of grass known by the common names para grass, buffalo grass, Mauritius signal grass, pasto pare, malojilla, gramalote, parana, Carib grass, and Scotch grass. Despite its common name California grass, it does not occur in California; it is native to northern and central Africa and parts of the Middle East, where it is cultivated for fodder. It was introduced elsewhere and it is now cultivated throughout tropical regions of the world for this purpose.

Description
It roots at the nodes and detached pieces of the plant will easily take root in moist ground. The rachis is tinged with purple. Although many flower-heads grow, only a few viable seeds are produced, and propagation is usually by vegetative means. Para grass can be distinguished from the closely related tanner grass (Brachiaria arrecta) by its paired spikelets, tanner grass having single spikelets.

Distribution and habitat
Para grass is native to northern and central Africa and parts of the Middle East. It was introduced into Central America but has largely been superseded there by other species of Brachiaria. It was also introduced into the humid, tropical parts of Australia around 1880 and has become widely naturalised in Queensland. By a few decades later it had become naturalised in much of southern Asia and on many Pacific islands, but is confined to its preferred habitat of poorly drained, swampy land. Along with tanner grass, it is planted as a fodder grass in seasonally flooded or swampy habitats, and in ponds in pastures, but it can block irrigation ditches and drains. When used as forage for cattle it is usually controlled by the action of the animals, so it does not become too weedy. When it grows in other habitats, however, it can become noxious. It is aggressive and can form dense stands. It may also have allelopathic effects on other plants, preventing their growth.

This species may have been introduced to the Americas on slave ships, on which it was used for bedding. It was in South America by the early 1800s and Mexico by 1872. It was introduced to Florida by the late 1870s to be used as fodder. It has since escaped cultivation in many areas and it now grows as a widespread weed. It is sensitive to frost so it generally does not persist outside warm regions.

Uses
Para grass is mainly cultivated to feed livestock as it makes a high quality forage for ruminant animals.

Invasive species
The plant is an invasive species in many Pacific Islands and Pacific Rim countries.

Australia
The plant has invaded the northern and north-western areas of Australia has the potential to spread further inland. It is present in Kakadu National Park. In Australia, this grass forms vast stands, destroying waterfowl nesting habitat and displacing native plants.

United States

In Florida this grass grows in various wetland habitat types, such as marshes and floodplains, as well as disturbed areas such as roadsides. In Hawaii this grass is widespread, especially in freshwater wetlands and in red mangrove (Rhizophora mangle) stands. It is thought to be a cause of the decline of the rare Hawaiian endemic Boyd's maiden fern (Thelypteris boydiae).

In Media 
The plant's California Grass name is mentioned in the Beatles song "Get Back" as the plant the protagonist Jojo is looking for, which can also be interpreted as a reference to cannabis.

References

External links
Urochloa mutica at NatureServe
Urochloa mutica at the Global Invasive Species Database
 Urochloa mutica Grass Manual Treatment.

Panicoideae
Grasses of Africa
Grasses of Asia